Kehoma Brenner (born 12 January 1986) is a German international rugby union player, playing for the Heidelberger RK in the Rugby-Bundesliga and the German national rugby union team.

Brenner played in the 2011 and 2012 German championship final for Heidelberger RK, which the club won both.

He made his debut for Germany on 11 November 2006 against Moldova.

He plays rugby since 1992, having played for the TB Rohrbach (1992-2004), Heidelberger RK (2004-2007) and RG Heidelberg (2007-2010) before returning to HRK once more in 2010.

Brenner has also played for the Germany's 7's side in the past, like at the 2009 Hannover Sevens and the 2009 London Sevens.

Honours

National team
 European Nations Cup - Division 2
 Champions: 2008

Club
 German rugby union championship
 Champions: 2011, 2012, 2013
 Runners up: 2008
 German rugby union cup
 Winners: 2011
 Runners up: 2008

Stats
Kehoma Brenner's personal statistics in club and international rugby:

Club

 As of 4 December 2013

National team

European Nations Cup

Friendlies & other competitions

 As of 4 December 2013

References

External links
 Kehoma Brenner at scrum.com
   Kehoma Brenner at totalrugby.de
  Kehoma Brenner at the DRV website

1986 births
Living people
German rugby union players
Germany international rugby union players
Heidelberger RK players
RG Heidelberg players
Rugby union flankers
Rugby union players from Durban
South African emigrants to Germany
South African rugby union players